Sir Howard Stransom Button MP DL (1873–1943) was a Conservative Member of Parliament for The Wrekin. He trained as a lawyer and was an expert in insolvency.

Life
He was born in Uxbridge on 14 February 1873 the son of Alfred Button and his wife Mary Jane Stransom. He had a twin sister Anne Louisa Stransom Button. Another sister was the artist Maud Ireland Button.

He won his seat as an MP in 1922.  The Liberals had won at the previous general election, but the Independent Parliamentary Group won it at two by-elections in 1920.  He stood down in 1923.

He was Chair of Middlesex County Council from 1933 to 1936, was knighted in 1936, and became High Sheriff of Middlesex in 1937.

In 1936 he sold the 186 acre Mad Bess Wood to his Council for £28,000. This now forms part of Ruislip Woods.

He was Honorary Colonel of the Finsbury Rifles.

He died on 18 August 1943. He is buried in Hillingdon and Uxbridge Cemetery.

References

Sources
British Parliamentary Election Results 1918-1949, FWS Craig
The Constitutional Year Book, 1929
Whitaker's Almanack, 1923 edition
"Obituary: Sir Howard Button. Public Life in London and Middlesex". The Times'' 20 August 1943. p. 8.
The London Gazette. 19 March 1937. p. 1819.

Members of Middlesex County Council
High Sheriffs of Middlesex
Conservative Party (UK) MPs for English constituencies
Politics of Shropshire
1943 deaths
Year of birth missing